Bruno of Querfurt ( 974 – 14 February or 9/14 March 1009), also known as Brun, was a Christian missionary bishop and martyr, who was beheaded near the border of Kievan Rus and Lithuania for trying to spread Christianity. He is also called the second "Apostle of the Prussians".

Biography

Early life 
Bruno was from a noble family of Querfurt (now in  Saxony-Anhalt). He is rumored to have been a relative of the Holy Roman Emperor Otto III. At the age of six, he was sent to be educated at the cathedral school in Magdeburg, seat of Adalbert of Magdeburg, the teacher and namesake of Adalbert of Prague. While still a youth, he was made a canon of the Cathedral of Magdeburg. The fifteen-year-old Otto III made Bruno a part of his royal court. In 995 Otto III appointed Bruno as his court chaplain.

While in Rome for Otto's imperial coronation, Bruno met Adalbert of Prague, the first "Apostle of the Prussians", killed a year later, which inspired Bruno to write a biography of Adalbert when he reached the recently Christianized and consolidated Kingdom of Hungary himself. Bruno spent much time at the monastery where Adalbert had become a monk and where abbot John Canaparius may have written a life of Adalbert. In 998, Bruno entered a Benedictine monastery near Ravenna that Otto had founded, and later underwent strict ascetic training under the guidance of Romuald.

Missionary life 

Otto III hoped to establish a monastery between the Elbe and the Oder (somewhere in the  pagan lands that became Brandenburg or Western Pomerania) to help convert the local population to Christianity and colonize the area. In 1001, two monks from his monastery traveled to Poland, while Bruno was with Otto in Italy, studying the language and awaiting the Apostolic appointment by Pope Sylvester II. 

In 1003 Pope Sylvester II appointed Bruno, at the age of 33, to head a mission amongst the pagan peoples of Eastern Europe. Bruno left Rome in 1004, and having been named an archbishop was consecrated in February of that year by Archbishop Tagino of Magdeburg. Owing to a regional conflict between the Holy Roman Emperor Henry II and Duke Boleslaus I of Poland, Bruno could not go directly to Poland so he set out for Hungary. There he went to the places that Adalbert of Prague had attended.

Bruno tried to persuade Ahtum, the Duke of Banat, who was under jurisdiction of Patriarchate of Constantinople to accept the jurisdiction of the Bishop of Rome, but this precipitated a large controversy leading to organized opposition from local monks. Bruno elected to gracefully exit the region after he first finished his book, the famous "Life of Adalbert of Prague," a literary memorial giving a history of the (relatively recent) conversion of the Hungarians.

After this diplomatic failure, Bruno went to Kyiv, where Grand Duke Vladimir I authorized him to make Christian converts among the Pechenegs, semi-nomadic Turkic peoples living between the Danube and the Don rivers. Bruno spent five months there and baptized some thirty adults. He helped to bring about a peace treaty between them and the ruler of Kyiv.

Before leaving for Poland, Bruno consecrated a bishop for the Pechenegs. While in Poland he consecrated the first Bishop of Sweden and is said to have sent emissaries to baptize the king of Sweden, whose mother had come from Poland. Bruno found out that his friend Benedict and four companions had been killed by robbers in 1003. Bruno took eyewitness accounts and wrote down a touching history of the so-called Five Martyred Brothers.

Mission to Prussia and death 

In the autumn or at the end of 1008 Bruno and eighteen companions set out to found a mission among the Old Prussians; they succeeded in converting Netimer and then traveled to the east, heading very likely towards Yotvingia.

Bruno met opposition in his efforts to evangelize the borderland and when he persisted in disregarding their warnings he was beheaded on 14 February (or 9 or 14 March) 1009, and most of his eighteen companions were hanged by Zebeden, brother of Netimer. Duke Boleslaus the Brave bought the bodies and brought them to Poland. (It was supposed that they were laid to rest in Przemyśl, where some historians place Bruno's diocese; such localization of Bruno's burial place is hardly probable because Przemyśl then belonged to Orthodox Kievan Rus through 1018.) The Annals of Magdeburg, Thietmar of Merseburg's Chronicle, the Annals of Quedlinburg, various works of Magdeburg Bishops, and many other written sources of 11th–15th centuries record this story.

Soon after his death, Bruno and his companions were venerated as martyrs and Bruno was soon after canonized. It was said that Braunsberg was named after Bruno.

See also 

Name of Lithuania
Christianization of Lithuania

References

Further reading
A. Bumblauskas. Lithuania’s Millennium –Millennium Lithuaniae Or What Lithuania Can Tell the World on this Occasion. Lietuvos istorijos studijos, 2009, t. 23, p. 127–158.
D. Baronas. ST BRUNO OF QUERFURT: THE MISSIONARY VOCATION. LITHUANIAN  HISTORICAL  STUDIES, 2009, t. 14.  p. 41–52.

External links 

 Saint Bruno Querfurt 

970s births
1009 deaths
People from Querfurt
Medieval German saints
German Roman Catholic missionaries
11th-century Christian saints
Camaldolese saints
Benedictine martyrs
Benedictine saints
Executed German people
11th-century Latin writers
11th-century German writers